Spadina—Fort York is a federal electoral district in Toronto, Ontario, Canada.

Spadina—Fort York was created by the 2012 federal electoral boundaries redistribution and was legally defined in the 2013 representation order. It came into effect upon the call of the 42nd Canadian federal election in October 2015. 

It covers most of the western portion of Downtown Toronto, and is essentially the successor of Trinity—Spadina, covering the area of that riding south of Dundas Street. It also absorbed part of the western portion of Toronto Centre.

Demographics
According to the Canada 2021 Census

Ethnic groups: 46.7% White, 14.5% Chinese, 12.8% South Asian, 6.1% Black, 3.4% Latin American, 2.6% Filipino, 2.3% Arab, 2.0% Southeast Asian, 1.9% West Asian, 1.8% Korean, 1.3% Indigenous
Languages: 55.0% English, 6.3% Mandarin, 4.0% Cantonese, 2.9% Spanish, 2.3% French, 2.1% Portuguese, 1.8% Hindi, 1.6% Russian, 1.6% Arabic, 1.3% Korean, 1.3% Persian, 1.0% Tagalog
Religions: 32.7% Christian (25.1% Catholic, 2.5% Christian Orthodox, 1.9% Anglican, 7.1% Other),  6.6% Muslim, 6.0% Hindu, 2.3% Jewish, 2.1% Buddhist, 1.0% Sikh, 48.3% None
Median income: $58,400 (2020) 
Average income: $78,400 (2020)

Members of Parliament

This riding has elected the following Members of Parliament:

Election results

References

External links
Spadina—Fort York boundary map & description (Elections.ca)

Ontario federal electoral districts
Federal electoral districts of Toronto
2013 establishments in Ontario